Alban is an Albanian, English, German and French masculine given name. The Albanian female version is Albana.

Notable people
Saints
Saint Alban, the first British martyr, for whom the town of St Albans in England is named
Saint Alban of Mainz, German martyr
Saint Alban Roe (1583–1642), English martyr and Benedictine priest

Others
Alban Arnold (1892–1916), English cricketer
Alban Bagbin, Speaker of the Parliament of Ghana
Alban Berg (1885–1935), Austrian composer
Alban Birch (1526–1599), English politician
Alban Bizhyti (born 1984), Albanian footballer
Alban Bunjaku (born 1994), Kosovar-Albanian footballer
Alban Bushi (born 1973), Albanian football coach
Alban Butler (1710–1773), English priest and hagiographer
Alban Curteis (1887–1961), English Royal Navy officer
Alban Çejku (born 2001), Albanian footballer
Alban Dobson (1885–1962), English cricketer
Alban Dorrinton (1800–1872), English cricketer
Alban Dudushi (born 1972), Albanian journalist
Alban Faust (born 1960), Swedish luthier
Alban Gerhardt (born 1969), German cellist
Alban Hoxha (born 1987), Albanian footballer
Alban Joinel (born 1979), French former footballer
Alban Jusufi (born 1981), Swedish-Albanian footballer
Alban Lafont (born 1999), French footballer
Alban Lendorf (born 1989), Danish ballet dancer
Alban Lenoir (born 1980), French actor, screenwriter and stuntman
Alban Lynch (born 1930), Australian mining engineer and academic
Alban Maginness (born 1950), Northern Irish politician and former Lord Mayor of Belfast
Alban Meha (born 1986), Kosovar-Albanian footballer
Alban Pierson (born 1972), French sport shooter
Alban Pnishi (born 1990), Kosovar-Albanian footballer
Alban Préaubert (born 1985), French former figure skater
Alban Ramaj (born 1985), Kosovar-Albanian retired footballer
Alban Ramosaj (born 1996), Albanian singer, songwriter, actor and producer
Alban Riley (1844–1914), Australian politician
Alban Skënderaj (born 1982), Albanian singer and songwriter
Alban Stolz (1808–1883), German theologian and author
Alban Thomas (1686–1771), Welsh doctor, librarian and antiquarian
Alban Ukaj (born 1980), Kosovar-Albanian actor
Dr. Alban (born 1957), Nigerian-Swedish musician and producer

Masculine given names